What's Love Got to Do with It is a 1993 American biographical film based on the life of American music icon Tina Turner. It was directed by Brian Gibson and written by Kate Lanier. The film stars Angela Bassett as Tina Turner and Laurence Fishburne as her husband Ike Turner.

Adapted from Tina Turner's autobiography I, Tina (1986), the film follows her life from a rural upbringing to her rise to stardom, along with her abusive marriage to Ike Turner.

What's Love Got to Do with It premiered in Los Angeles on June 6, 1993 and was theatrically released by Touchstone Pictures on June 25, 1993. Although Tina Turner and Ike Turner were not happy with the accuracy of the film, it was a critical and commercial success. It grossed $61 million on a $15 million budget. For their performances, Bassett and Fishburne received nominations at the 66th Academy Awards for Best Actress and Best Actor. Bassett also won the Golden Globe Award for Best Actress – Motion Picture Comedy or Musical.

Plot
Raised in Nutbush, Tennessee in the early 1950s, Anna Mae Bullock returns from being sent home from her Baptist church for oversinging when she sees her mother Zelma leaving her home, this time for good. Returning back to her house, she is distraught over her mother leaving and is consoled by her grandmother Georgeanna. Six years later, a teenage Anna Mae relocates to St. Louis, where she reunites with her elder sister Alline and her mother. While in St. Louis, Anna is taken by Alline to a nightclub at East St. Louis where, after viewing a performance by charismatic bandleader named Ike Turner and his band the Kings of Rhythm, she pursues a position to sing with Turner after noting women coming onstage to sing with the musician. One night, Anna finally gets her chance to perform for Ike and impresses the bandleader so much that he offers to mentor her and produce her music. In time, Ike and Anna develop a close friendship. 

As the first front woman of the Kings of Rhythm, along with the formation of a backing girl group, later known as the Ikettes, Anna develops a local popularity at the St. Louis club scene. However, after Ike's girlfriend, Lorraine Taylor, shoots herself after confronting Anna on rumors she and Ike had slept together, she and Ike begin an unexpected romance. After recording the hit, "A Fool in Love", Anna becomes pregnant with their son Ronnie and Anna learns, while in the hospital, that her name has changed to Tina Turner after the radio station announces the name "Ike & Tina Turner" following the playing of "A Fool in Love". Though told she was anaemic and in need of three weeks rest in hospital following her pregnancy, Ike takes Tina out of the hospital and convinces her to marry him in Tijuana. Problems begin developing between Ike and Tina almost immediately after "A Fool in Love" when Tina complains of being overworked, angering Ike to the point he verbally abuses her before a show at the Apollo Theater. Despite this, when Tina takes the stage that night to perform the song, the Ike & Tina Turner Revue becomes a national sensation and relocates to Los Angeles. Upon learning that Ike & Tina have moved to Los Angeles, Lorraine Taylor makes an unexpected visit to their new home and drops off Ike's previous children, Ike Jr. and Michael, with Tina's other sons Craig and Ronnie, which further complicates matters at home. 

One day while at home, Tina voices her opinion that Ike's music "all sounds the same", which leads to Ike beating her in front of their four sons. Following a performance on a teen rock and roll show in 1966, Tina is offered a solo deal with Phil Spector for the song, "River Deep - Mountain High", which upsets Ike, though he takes the $25,000 Spector offers to keep out of the studio. Following the song's successful launch, Ike & Tina celebrates by having lunch at a diner, but this ends when Tina gets into a fight with Ike over him offering her a piece of pound cake, leading to a public fight, which leads to one of the Ikettes, a close friend of Tina's, leaving after Ike slaps her. Fed up with Ike's abuse one morning, Tina calls her mother Zelma telling her she was leaving Ike and heading back to St. Louis. But while on their way back, Ike learns of their whereabouts and drags Tina back to California. While opening for the Rolling Stones in London, Ike & Tina find success with their recording of "Proud Mary", which transforms the Revue from a national R&B phenomenon to an international sensation. Overtime, crowds begin clamoring more to Tina than Ike, which causes further tension as Ike discovers cocaine. 

During one recording session of the song, "Nutbush City Limits" in 1973, an addicted Ike verbally attacks Tina for not singing the song properly, blaming her for the duo's issues in following their previous hits. After hitting Tina repeatedly, he initiates raping Tina. Finding no chance of escape, one night, Tina overdoses a full bottle of sleeping pills before a show and is rushed to a hospital where she recovers. Tina eventually visits a friend, a former Ikette, who convinces her to practice Buddhism and the chant Nam-Myoho-Renge-Kyo, telling her that the chanting would "change her life". Though skeptical, Tina attempts it and soon begins feverishly chanting, to the shock of onlookers, including Ike, who is distracted by the new Tina. Then, in 1976, while en route to a show in Dallas, a fed-up Tina begins to annoy Ike. While in the limousine on their way to the hotel, Ike and Tina engage in a physical fight which leaves them both bloodied and battered. Upon their entry, Ike falls asleep and Tina makes her escape with only her purse. Afraid of being found out, Tina runs to the back of the hotel and faces oncoming traffic before arriving at a Ramada Inn where she pleads to the hotel manager that she needs a room despite only having 36 cents on her person, the manager agrees and gives Tina the room. Tina later files for divorce and in the final matter, Tina agrees to give up everything except her stage name, which is granted. 

In 1980, Tina begins rebuilding her career at the cabaret circuit and invites a young impresario named Roger Davies to see her perform so he could manage her and help her realize her dreams as a rock star. Impressed that she still could perform, Davies agrees to manage her. Still, the presence of Ike threatens to derail her chances. After one rehearsal, Ike spots her and tries to convince her to return back to him. When she refuses, Ike gets belligerent and Tina leaves before Ike becomes violent. One night, around 1983, while watching an interview of herself on TV, a battered Ike Jr. comes to her house, warning her that Ike has plans of killing her. Turning to her Buddhist faith, she prepares for a show at the Ritz Theatre where Ike confronts her at her dressing room with a gun. Undeterred, Tina verbally silences him and leaves the dressing room where she dazzles the audience at the Ritz with her new hit single, "What's Love Got to Do with It" where she eventually realizes her dream of being a rock superstar.

Cast

 Angela Bassett as Tina Turner, born Anna Mae Bullock
 Rae'Ven Larrymore Kelly as young Anna Mae
 Cora Lee Day as Grandma Georgiana
 Khandi Alexander as Darlene
 Laurence Fishburne as Ike Turner
 Jenifer Lewis as Zelma Bullock, Tina's mother
 Phyllis Yvonne Stickney as Alline Bullock
 Penny Johnson Jerald as Lorraine Taylor
 Vanessa Bell Calloway as Jackie
 Chi McBride as Fross
 Sherman Augustus as Reggie
 Terrence Riggins as Spider
 Bo Kane as Dance Show Host
 Terrence Evans as Bus Driver
 Rob LaBelle as Phil Spector
 James Reyne as Roger Davies
 Richard T. Jones as Ike Turner Jr.
 Shavar Ross as Michael Turner
 Damon Hines as Ronnie Turner
 Suli McCullough as Craig Turner
 Elijah B. Saleem as teenage Ike Turner Jr.

Production

Halle Berry, Robin Givens, Pam Grier, Whitney Houston, Janet Jackson, and Vanessa L. Williams were all considered for the role of Tina Turner. Whitney Houston was actually offered the role, but had to decline due to imminent maternity. Jenifer Lewis also originally auditioned to play Tina Turner but was cast instead as Tina's mother despite being only a year older than Bassett.

Angela Bassett auditioned for the role in October 1992 and was chosen only a month before production began in December. During that time, she had to learn not only how to talk like Turner but to dance and move like her. She would have been willing to try to do the singing as well, but ''not in the time we had,'' she said. ''I did think about it for a second, though.'' Instead, she lip syncs to soundtracks recorded by Tina Turner and Fishburne. Bassett worked with Tina Turner, but only ''a little bit.'' Turner helped most with the re-creations of her famed dance routines. She also re-recorded new versions of all the Ike & Tina Turner songs used in the film.

Laurence Fishburne was offered the role of Ike Turner five times and turned it down each time. "It was pretty one-sided," said Fishburne, who turned down the project based on the script he first read. Ike, Fishburne added, was "obviously the villain of the piece, but there was no explanation as to why he behaved the way he behaved - why she was with him for 16 to 20 years, what made her stay." The writers made some changes and though Ike is still shown as a pretty despicable sort, the film offers at least some insight into him - most notably a scene in which Ike recalls watching, at age 6, his father's death from wounds suffered in a fight over a woman. The changes helped persuade Fishburne to do the role, but he says that Bassett's casting as Tina "was the deciding factor."

Fishburne did not have Ike Turner around to help model his performance as much as he would have liked. He met him once during production of the film. "He was not particularly welcome on this project," Fishburne says. The actor's only meeting was a brief introduction when Ike showed up at the Turners' former home in View Park during a location shoot. Ike signed some autographs and showed Fishburne his walk. "It was nice to meet him," says Fishburne. "Regardless of his actions, he was so much a part of Tina's life. The movie is about him just as much as her. It's unfortunate that he wasn't welcomed, that both of them weren't around more." Director Brian Gibson had no contact with Ike. "I never spoke to him," says Gibson. "I was not allowed to. Disney felt that it would not be a good idea."

Screenwriter Kate Lanier omitted much of the brutality Tina Turner said she endured in her book. Her character was also sanitized; most notably, her relationship with saxophonist Raymond Hill and the birth of their son was excluded from the film. Lanier admitted that Tina Turner was not happy with certain aspects of the film because some parts were fictionalized. Tina Turner tried to talk to the Disney filmmakers about the script. In 1993, she told Vanity Fair that they saw "a deep need" to make a film about "a woman who was a victim to a con man. How weak! How shallow! How dare you think that was what I was? I was in control every minute there. I was there because I wanted to be, because I had promised." She added, "O.K. so if I was a victim, fine. Maybe I was a victim for a short while. But give me credit for thinking the whole time I was there. See, I do have pride."

Inaccuracies
Although the film was adapted from Tina Turner's autobiography I, Tina, elements of the script were "fictionalized for dramatic purposes."

 Ike did not sing or play guitar on the record "Rocket 88" as depicted in the film. He wrote the song and played piano on the record. His saxophonist Jackie Brenston was the vocalist. The record was released under the alias Jackie Brenston and his Delta Cats who were actually Ike's band the Kings of Rhythm.
 The song Anna Mae first performs onstage with Ike, "You Know I Love You", was actually a slower B.B. King blues ballad; Ike played piano on King's record. When Anna Mae sang the song, Ike played the organ, not the guitar as depicted in the film. Tina recorded a blues rock rendition of the song for the film's soundtrack.
Anna Mae and Ike did not have sex the night his live-in girlfriend Lorraine Taylor shot herself as depicted. In reality, when Anna Mae was pregnant in 1958, Lorraine pulled a gun on her before shooting herself because she believed that Anna Mae and Ike were having an affair. However, Anna Mae and Ike were platonic friends until 1960 when she went to sleep in his bed after a musician threatened to come into her room.
 The first song Anna Mae is portrayed recording, "Tina's Wish", is actually a 1973 track titled "Make Me Over" from the album Nutbush City Limits. In reality, the first song she recorded is "Boxtop" in 1958.
 A theater marquee is shown for a 1960 show starring Otis Redding, Martha and the Vandellas, and Ike & Tina Turner. In reality, Martha and the Vandellas were known as The Del-Phis until 1961, and Otis Redding didn't release his first solo single until 1962.
 In the film, Anna Mae learns of her name change to Tina Turner after her song is played on a radio in the hospital where she had given birth. In reality, Ike & Tina Turner's debut single "A Fool In Love" was released in August 1960, months before she gave birth to their son. 
 In real life, Ike didn't call her Anna Mae, he called her either Ann or "Bo" (short for her surname Bullock). Even after she received the stage name Tina Turner, family and friends still called her Ann.
The film implies that Tina's eldest child, Craig Raymond (born Raymond Craig in 1958), is Ike's biological son. In reality, his biological father was saxophonist Raymond Hill and Ike later adopted him. Tina and Ike have one biological child, Ronald "Ronnie" Renelle, born in 1960.
 The film depicts Ike and his entourage sneaking Tina out of the hospital after she gave birth to get married. In reality, Ike was not present for the birth of their son Ronnie. Tina wrote in her book that a few days after she checked herself out of the hospital, she discovered that the woman Ike hired to replace her while she recuperated was a prostitute using her stage name Tina Turner to get clients. She confronted the woman and after they got into a fight, Tina performed a show that night. Ike wrote in his book Takin' Back My Name that he was unaware the woman was a prostitute. He was out of town to attend a court hearing in St. Louis when Tina gave birth in Los Angeles. They married in 1962, two years after the birth of their son.
 Lorraine Taylor, the mother of Ike's sons Ike Junior and Michael, did not drop them off at his home with Tina as depicted in the film. In reality, Ike went to St. Louis and brought his sons to Los Angeles after Lorraine informed him she was going to leave them there. Tina also brought her son Craig to live with them.
 In a scene dated 1968, Ike and Tina open for The Rolling Stones performing "Proud Mary." In reality, Ike and Tina didn't perform "Proud Mary" until after it was released by Creedence Clearwater Revival in 1969. The Rolling Stones didn't have any concerts in 1968; Ike and Tina opened for them on their 1966 British Tour and 1969 American Tour.
 Jackie and Fross are both fictional characters. Jackie represents an amalgamation of Ikettes and associates of Tina, one of which was Ike's friend Valerie Bishop who introduced Tina to Buddhism in 1973.
 The infamous "eat the cake Anna Mae" scene was an exaggerated reenactment of an incident that occurred during the early years of the revue. Tina recalled that when they stopped to order food, someone brought her a pound cake while they were sitting in a car. Although Tina said she didn't order it, Ike ordered her to eat all of it while he watched.
 The scene where Tina was raped during the recording of "Nutbush City Limits" was exaggerated from what she stated in her book. Tina claimed that sometimes after Ike would hit her, he then would have sex with her. Ike maintained that he never raped Tina. "Nutbush City Limits" was recorded at their Bolic Sound recording studio, not at home as depicted in the film.
 The film depicts Tina's suicide attempt in 1974 when it actually occurred six years prior in 1968.
 Ike did not tell Tina "if you don't make it, I'll kill you" as depicted in the ambulance scene. Tina stated in her book that after her suicide attempt she joked with a friend that she was so afraid of Ike, he probably threatened her which is why she survived. She was unconscious and didn't know what he actually said. Ike stated in his book that he scolded Tina as his way of motivating her to fight for her life.
 During the time Tina is planning her comeback in the early 1980s, a reenactment of an interview features Tina rehearsing her song "I Might Have Been Queen." The song would be recorded for her 1984 comeback album, Private Dancer.
 The incident in the Ritz Theatre where Ike fails to scare Tina with his pistol is fabricated. Allegedly, Ike made threats to hire a hitman, so Tina carried a pistol, but he did not threaten her in person with a gun as depicted.
 Before performing "What's Love Got to Do with It " at the Ritz in 1983, the emcee announces that it was her "first appearance," but she first performed there in 1981. Her 1983 performance there occurred before the recording of "What's Love Got to Do with It" and led to Capitol Records signing a contract with her.
 A title card at the end states that Tina's first solo album won four Grammy Awards, implying it was Private Dancer. In reality that album was her fifth solo album. Her first two solo albums (Tina Turns The Country On! and Acid Queen) were released while she was still with Ike, and two (Rough and Love Explosion) were released after.

Reception

Critical response
What's Love Got to Do with It received critical acclaim. On Rotten Tomatoes, it has a "Certified Fresh" approval rating of 96% based on 57 reviews, with an average rating of 7.5/10. The site's consensus is: "With a fascinating real-life story and powerhouse performances from Angela Bassett and Laurence Fishburne, What's Love Got to Do with It is a can't miss biopic." Metacritic, which assigns a weighted average to critics' reviews, gave the film an average score of 76 out of 100 based on 26 critics, indicating "generally favorable reviews". Audiences polled by CinemaScore gave the film an average grade of "A" on an A+ to F scale.
 

Janet Maslin of The New York Times wrote: "The brilliant, mercurial portrayal of Ike Turner by Laurence Fishburne, formerly known as Larry, is what elevates 'What's Love Got to Do With It' beyond the realm of run-of-the-mill biography." Gene Siskel of the Chicago Tribune gave it 4 out of 4, calling it: "A powerful, joyful, raw, energetically acted bio-pic detailing the joys and pain of the on- and offstage lives of blues rockers Ike and Tina Turner."

Tina Turner stated she wished the film had not portrayed her as a "victim". In 2018, Turner told Oprah Winfrey that she had only recently watched the film. She said, "I watched a little bit of it, but I didn't finish it because that was not how things went. Oprah, I didn't realize they would change the details so much."

Ike Turner said that the film and Tina Turner's book are "filled with lies". In his autobiography, Takin' Back My Name, he said Fishburne did "a fantastic job, though the job he did isn't really me". He also stated he was upset about the rape scene, which he claimed was fabricated and "was the lowest thing they could have ever done". He added that the film damaged his reputation.

Box office
The film grossed $40.1 million in the United States and Canada and $20.5 million internationally for a worldwide total of $60.6 million.

Awards

American Film Institute
The film is recognized by American Film Institute in these lists:
 2004: AFI's 100 Years...100 Songs:
 "What's Love Got to Do with It" – Nominated
 2006: AFI's 100 Years...100 Cheers – #85

Top lists
 Ranked #1 on Favorite Movie of the Year in 1994 by Ebony Readers' Poll
 Ranked #2 on Top 9 Subjects of a Music Bio-Pic by Entertainment Weekly
 Ranked #8 on Top 10 Best Rock Biopics by Rolling Stone Readers' Poll
 Ranked #9 on The Best Black Movies of the Last 30 Years By Complex

Soundtrack

References

Bibliography

Notes

External links

 
 
 
 

1993 films
1990s biographical drama films
African-American biographical dramas
African-American films
American biographical drama films
Biographical films about singers
Drama films based on actual events
1990s English-language films
Films about domestic violence
Films based on biographies
Films directed by Brian Gibson
Films featuring a Best Musical or Comedy Actress Golden Globe winning performance
Films scored by Stanley Clarke
Films set in the 1950s
Films set in 1958
Films set in the 1960s
Films set in 1960
Films set in 1964
Films set in 1968
Films set in the 1970s
Films set in 1971
Films set in 1974
Films set in 1977
Films set in the 1980s
Films set in 1980
Films set in 1983
Films set in St. Louis
Films set in Tennessee
Films shot in Chicago
Films shot in El Paso, Texas
Films shot in London
Films shot in Los Angeles
Films shot in Missouri
Films shot in New York City
Films shot in Tennessee
Films about rape
Tina Turner
Touchstone Pictures films
Cultural depictions of soul musicians
Cultural depictions of pop musicians
Cultural depictions of American women
Cultural depictions of rock musicians
1993 drama films
1990s American films